Daniel Dimov (born 21 January 1989) is a Bulgarian professional footballer who plays for Cherno More Varna, where he is also club captain. Originally a defensive midfielder, in the last years he has been used mostly as a centre back.

Dimov came through the academy system at Cherno More and made over 60 appearances for the first team before signing with Levski Sofia in December 2010. He then made the move to Israel to sign for Maccabi Petah Tikva in July 2014. After success there, Dimov joined Turkish club Denizlispor a year later. In July 2016, after one season at Denizlispor, he signed with Manisaspor. In February 2018 returned to Cherno More, spending six months there. In August 2018 he moved to Boluspor, before returning again to his first club a year later.

Club career

Cherno More

Dimov began his career at Cherno More Varna, progressing through the club's youth system. He made his debut during the 2006–07 season, in a 6–0 away win over Chernomorets Burgas Sofia on 15 September 2006, coming on as a substitute for Slavi Zhekov.
On 14 July 2007, Dimov scored his first goal for a 3-0 home win against Makedonija Gjorče Petrov in the second round of the Intertoto Cup.

In the 2009–10 A Group season he earned 17 appearances in the league. On 1 March 2010, Dimov scored his first league goal in a 2–0 home win against Chernomorets Burgas. On 4 April, Dimov hit his second goal of the season against Sportist Svoge in a 3–0 win.

On 2 October 2010, Dimov scored his third goal for Cherno More, netting in the 40th minute of their 1–3 away loss against Litex Lovech. On 23 October, he made his 50th appearance for the team in the A Group in a 0–4 loss against Montana.

Levski Sofia
After weeks of speculation, the transfer saga of Dimov finally ended on 26 December 2010 when Levski Sofia announced on the official website that Cherno More and Levski had reached an agreement for the transfer of Dimov. In Sofia, Daniel signed a three-a-half-year contract with Levski, keeping him there until 30 June 2014.

In June 2014 Dimov refused to renew his contract with Levski and decided to leave after 3 years of playing in which he played in 73 appearances and scored 8 goals in total.

Return to Cherno More
Having played  years abroad, on 13 February 2018 Dimov returned to his first club Cherno More, signing a short-term contract.  On 23 February, he made his second debut in a 0–0 away draw against CSKA Sofia.

Boluspor
On 7 August 2018, Dimov signed with Turkish club Boluspor for two years.

Career statistics

International career
On 1 October 2010, Dimov received his first call-up to the Bulgaria national team for the Euro 2012 qualifying match against Wales and the friendly match against Saudi Arabia from Lothar Matthäus. However, he did not feature in any of these games. He made his debut on 25 March 2021 in a World Cup qualifier against Switzerland.

References

External links 
 Profile at LevskiSofia.info
 

1989 births
Living people
People from Dobrich
Bulgarian footballers
Bulgaria under-21 international footballers
Association football midfielders
Association football central defenders
First Professional Football League (Bulgaria) players
Israeli Premier League players
TFF First League players
PFC Cherno More Varna players
PFC Levski Sofia players
Maccabi Petah Tikva F.C. players
Denizlispor footballers
Manisaspor footballers
Boluspor footballers
Bulgarian expatriate footballers
Expatriate footballers in Israel
Bulgarian expatriate sportspeople in Israel
Expatriate footballers in Turkey
Bulgarian expatriate sportspeople in Turkey
Bulgaria international footballers